Hampden Bridge is a heritage-listed single-span suspension bridge that carries Moss Vale Road (B73) across the Kangaroo River, in Kangaroo Valley, in the City of Shoalhaven local government area of New South Wales, Australia. The bridge was designed by Ernest de Burgh and built by Loveridge and Hudson. The property is owned by Transport for NSW. It was added to the New South Wales State Heritage Register on 2 August 2019.

Opened on 19 May 1898, the bridge is named in honour of Lord Hampden, the Governor of New South Wales from 1895 to 1899.

History 

Hampden Bridge was designed by Ernest Macartney de Burgh, the colony's Assistant Engineer for Bridges, to replace the decaying timber truss bridge which originally spanned the Kangaroo River.  The bridge was opened on 19 May 1898, just six days before floods washed the old bridge away. Construction was by Thomas Loveridge and Herbert Hudson and began in 1895. At the conclusion they formed a partnership, Loveridge and Hudson.

A public holiday was declared in Kangaroo Valley for the bridge opening. The bridge was opened by the Minister for Public Works, J. H. Young.

History of Kangaroo Valley

Kangaroo Valley region is within the Dharawal/Thurawal clan country, a language group extending generally from the "Cowpastures" (Camden/Appin) east along Georges River then to the south of Jervis Bay and west to Braidwood. The Wodi Wodi and Wandrawandian, Dharawal sub groups from the Illawarra-Shoalhaven area accessed the valley year round. Local Dharawal names are still used such as "Noggarah", a big gully and "Parronrah", suitable camping areas on the river side flats. Kangaroos and other wildlife abounded and the valley was considered a refuge or game reserve, sometimes used as a meeting place for the various family groups to replenish on their journey to the "Cowpastures" around the Camden/Appin area, where larger gatherings took place with neighbouring clans such as the Gundungurra from the Blue Mountains, to trade and conduct ceremony. Quite often disputes were also addressed through a formal process.

The arrival of the cedar getters and cattlemen in the 1800s changed the Aboriginal way of life and eventually only two family groups were recorded as living in the valley; at Trimbles Creek, north end of the valley and along the river on the southern side of the main village. By the early 1900s these remaining family groups were displaced from their lands and relocated with their remaining family groups clustered along the Illawarra/Shoalhaven coast, in places such as the (former) government reserves at Coomaditchee, Roseby Park and Wreck Bay.

Regardless of the physical exorcising of the Aboriginal people from the land, the rich Aboriginal landscape of this valley remains captured in the numerous traditional campsites marked by stone artefact scatters along the "Parronrah" and axe grinding grooves at Barrengarry; and also in the special places such as rock art sites in the sandstone overhangs along the "Noggarah" that feed into the main river, accompanied by the sharing of stories and song lines describing the important connections people have to country, and most importantly in the continuing culture of the Aboriginal people of the region today.

European settlement of the valley began in the late 1810s, with Richard Brooks sending cattle into the valley from the already settled districts of Berrima and Sutton Forest in 1817 and then taking up a grant in the valley in 1820. Others moved into the valley from Sutton Forest to occupy land around Brogers Creek. Cedar- getting also commenced in the first half of this century, with Kangaroo Valley known for its red cedar. Kangaroo Valley was surveyed by Hoddle in 1831. Several areas were selected for cattle stations in the 1830s, but the 1841 census showed only seven men inhabiting the valley.

Charles Throsby had passed through Kangaroo Valley in 1818 in search of a route from the coast to the settled districts along the Great South Road (Hume Highway). Throsby's route may have laid the line for the Cambewarra Road. The Cambewarra Road remained an important connection between the more closely settled districts to the north-west, with road access to Parramatta and Sydney, and the south coast. With access from Sydney to Wollongong still difficult into the early twentieth century, travelling to the south coast via the Cambewarra Road, remained a popular way (and still is today) to reach the south coast.

Henry Osborne, an Irish settler was a prominent landholder in the valley as well at other locations across the state and in 1837 held over 4000 acres. Charles McCaffrey, one of a group of settlers from Fermanagh, Ireland, brought dairy farming into the Kiama-Shoalhaven region, settling at Barrengarry in 1846. He soon began a dairy and butter production. Once Kangaroo Valley was opened to free settlement, the population grew from 200 in 1861, to 1,400 in 1881 as dairy farmers flocked to the valley. The region developed to become the Colony's major butter producer. However, travelling out of the region to the coast and Southern Highlands was still restricted by having to cross a ford over the Kangaroo River.

As the local farming activities reached a peak in the 1870s, it was decided to construct a two span timber truss bridge over the Kangaroo River of the "Old Public Works Department" (Old PWD) design. The call for tenders was advertised in the Government Gazette 21 August 1874, p. 2531. The awarding of the contract to build the bridge for A£3,000 to the Braidwood-based company, Kelly and Walsh was advertised in the Government Gazette 11 September 1876 p. 3608. According to Clark (1998) there were many unforeseen difficulties encountered during construction which resulted in the shifting of the site of the bridge to help with bridge construction. The bridge which was named the Kangaroo Valley Bridge was opened on 14 August 1879 by Thomas Garrett, MP. The new bridge significantly improved access for the residents of the Valley, supported the five butter factories, the main township which had now gained a school, Post Office, churches and hotel and the nearby village of Barrengarry.

Although this timber truss bridge was constructed to be a "permanent" structure, it was soon discovered that the bridge's condition was deteriorating. In 1893 two large girders and wire rope were placed under the structure for additional strength. At the same time, planning began for the replacement of the bridge with a new suspension bridge which was to become far-famed as "the greatest feat of engineering in the valley and the second greatest in the colony of New South Wales".

Farm amalgamations in the twentieth century have reduced the population greatly, and hobby farmers and retirees are increasingly attracted to the valley. Otherwise, the character of the township has not changed significantly in the last 130 years with a number of heritage buildings remaining. The valley is now a popular tourist destination with a range of accommodation choices available, including bed and breakfasts. The bridge forms an important landmark and an attraction, as well as to this day being still the main access across the Kangaroo River. The bridge is well known to those who reside in the valley, and to the wider public of Sydney and the South Coast region.

History of early bridges constructed in NSW 
The first bridge constructed in NSW was built in 1788. The bridge was a simple timber bridge constructed over the Tank Stream, near what is today the intersection of Pitt and Bridge Streets in the Sydney central business district. Soon after its construction, it was washed away and needed to be replaced. The first "permanent" bridge in NSW was the first bridge's successor. This was a stone arch bridge with a span of  erected in 1803. However this was not a triumph of colonial bridge engineering, as it collapsed after only three years of service. It took a further five years for the bridge to be rebuilt in an improved form. Prior to the arrival of David Lennox in the Colony in 1832, NSW was without expert knowledge in bridge design and construction. Lennox, who had worked with the famous bridge engineer Thomas Telford, became the Superintendent of Bridges for NSW in 1833.

During the first 60 years of the Colony, the majority of bridges were built from stone or timber, in the same manner as bridges being constructed in Britain and Europe. Stone was the bridge building material of choice in NSW, with construction costs kept low by the use of convict labour. However, with the cessation of convict transportation in the 1840s and subsequent rise in labour costs, bridge designers were forced to explore the use of other materials in bridge construction, leading to the eventual adoption of timber as the economical alternative. The size and quantity of readily available Australian hardwoods in the 1800s allowed the design and construction of efficient timber truss bridge designs reaching respectable spans.

History of suspension bridges in NSW 
The history of the construction of suspension road bridges in NSW is rather limited compared to the more commonly built timber truss, steel, lift and concrete bridges that have been constructed in NSW since the 1800s. Suspension bridges have been more widely used as pedestrian bridges such as at river, creek and bay crossings (for example Hunter River, Moonan Flat and Parsley Bay, Vaucluse).

The first suspension road bridge constructed in NSW was at Long Gully, Northbridge in Sydney that was opened to traffic in 1892.

It was built as a timber deck suspension bridge with steel cables and ornate sandstone turreted towers by private developers to promote future residential development to the north. The original suspension bridge was constructed with a  main span that was supported by steel cables and hanger rods. The deck was stiffened by an undertruss which was pin connected at the centre of the span. The steel cables were supported on sandstone towers and anchored into bedrock at each end of the gorge. The wooden deck contained two traffic lanes plus two tram tracks and pedestrian footways. Following taking ownership of Northbridge Bridge in 1935, the then Department of Main Roads carried out inspections of the bridge which revealed that significant corrosion was occurring in the steelwork and cables. It was decided to replace the suspension bridge with a reinforced concrete arch with the original sandstone towers retained. The bridge was re-opened to traffic in 1939.

Hampden Bridge at Kangaroo Valley was the second suspension bridge to be built in NSW and is now the only surviving suspension road bridge from the Nineteenth Century. It replaced a previous timber truss bridge built in 1879. The new bridge was designed by Ernest Macartney De Burgh. It is noteworthy that De Burgh, in 1894 designed a suspension pedestrian bridge at the village of Tuena, NSW. Whilst this bridge was of a differing design, it is likely that De Burgh had incorporated some of design calculations into the development of the design of Hampden Bridge. Hampden Bridge was opened in 1898.

History of the Hampden Bridge 
Design and construction 
Design for the new suspension bridge to replace the deteriorating timber bridge began when the Department of Public Works Engineer, Ernest de Burgh visited the site on 21 April 1895 to survey the site for the new bridge. De Burgh's design for the bridge included stone towers quarried on site to support steel cables, steel hangers and timber decking with two stiffening trusses formed by the timber and steel railing of the bridge. De Burgh in the design of the stiffening trusses adopted the same design he had used on 20 freestanding timber truss bridges that were built between 1900 and 1905, for example Landsdowne Bridge over Mulwaree Ponds.

An article titled A Magnificent Bridge - The New Structure over Kangaroo River appeared in The Kangaroo Valley Times in April 1896 announcing the imminent construction of the new bridge to be upstream of the previous bridge. To carry the cables there will be erected on each side of the river a pair of towers of sandstone masonry, produced from the immediate vicinity of the bridge.

The company Loveridge & Hudson were engaged as the builders for the new bridge. Loveridge & Hudson had previously worked on a number of significant projects in Sydney, including modifications to the Customs House at Circular Quay and the renowned High Victorian architectural style Great Synagogue, Elizabeth Street, Sydney.

The first milestone celebrated in the construction period was on 30 May 1896 when the keystone to the southern end pier was laid by Florence Comer whose family had a number of associations with the Kangaroo Valley region. The keystone to the northern end pier was then laid less than 4 months later on 3 September 1896 by Barrengarry businessman Israel Karnofsky.

Construction progressed into the second half of 1896 with the completion of one abutment, partial completion of the other abutment; all masonry work, parapets and excavations undertaken for the placement of the concrete thrust blocks. However, a significant setback was the erection of the wire cables. New wire cables had to be sought from London, UK as the previously acquired cables were not satisfactory. It was not until July 1897 that first of the wire cables could be installed on the bridge. Without any more major setbacks, the construction of the bridge was progressed leading to its opening to traffic in February 1898.

On 2 February 1898, the Hampden Bridge was declared open to traffic by valley resident John King who also opened the former timber truss bridge. Leading up to the official opening, a number of tasks were identified as part of the "clean up" including the removal of the old timber bridge. However, this was not required as on 12 February 1898, the largest flood since 1870 hit the region with a flood peak of  resulting in the bridge breaking up and being washed downstream. Importantly, the new bridge was constructed  higher than the previous bridge.

The official opening took place on 19 May 1898. The opening ceremony was performed by the Minister for Works, James Henry Young, MP before a crowd of 400 people. He was accompanied by Robert R. P. Hickson, Engineer-in-Chief and Ernest De Burgh, bridge designer. The Minister in his opening speech remarked that he "might go over the great Australian continent, and would find nothing equal of it". The bridge was named after Lord Hampden, Governor of New South Wales from 1895 to 1899. Total construction cost of the bridge was A£8,382.

In 1987 the bridge was declared as one of fifty most historic bridges in NSW.

Description
The bridge is located in an undulating river valley terrain, with a sheer sandstone face on its northern side and sandy inclined riverbank on the southern side. The river flows westward under the bridge. The bridge features four large Victorian Gothic Revival crenellated turrets made of locally quarried sandstone. This elaborate form, and the relatively sophisticated structural design of the span, reflect the importance of this river crossing at the time of construction: the Cambewarra Road (now the Moss Vale Road) was then a major route from Sydney to the south coast of NSW.

The deck is stiffened by timber side trusses which are hinged at midspan.

Hampden Bridge is the only surviving suspension bridge from the colonial period in New South Wales; and is the oldest and only timber suspension bridge still carrying vehicular traffic still in operation within Australia.

In 2012 the bridge underwent a major A$3 million renovation by Roads & Maritime Services, after many years of lobbying by local resident Bruce Ramsay, who agitated for the preservation of this iconic structure.

Towers and abutments

The towers, constructed mainly from sandstone quarried on the site are of Victorian Gothic style, similar to the (former) suspension bridge at Northbridge in Sydney. Each tower has two columns, joined by an elliptically arched crossbeam above traffic height.

In section, the towers are formed by a solid mass concrete core and finished with sandstone blocks. They sit on mass concrete which in turn was cast onto excavations to solid sandstone. Immediately below the roller saddle bearings supporting the cables, the mass concrete is surmounted by bedstones composed of the rarely found hard trachyte weighing 3 tonnes and quarried at Mount Gibraltar at Bowral. The cables enter the towers through openings close to the battlement height of the cross wall, and each tower is then topped with an enlarged battlement. The finish of the sandstone is a combination of smooth ashlar battlement details and rock-faced finish on the main column faces. The original design incorporated drainage gratings in the floor of the upper battlements.

Extending out from the base of each tower are sandstone parapet walls framing the approaches to the bridge. These are rubble filled, and topped with footpaths, kerbs and drainage grates on each side of the roadway. The parapet walls connect the towers to the cable anchorage structures. These consist of a shaft sunk some 25 ft into sound sandstone. At the bottom of each shaft is an enlarged chamber where riveted steel beams transfer the tensile forces from the cables to upthrust in the sandstone above. At the surface there are cast iron shoulder castings which turn the cables from inclined to vertical. The thrust forces from these are transferred into the sandstone bedrock via further 5 ton trachyte thrust blocks set in concrete. Each anchor pit is surmounted by a small crenelated turret, with an access cover adjacent. This allows access to the bottom of the pit via a full height access ladder.

One of the significant construction tasks was the excavation of drainage tunnels for the pit. These tunnels were excavated by drilling and blasting.

Suspension cables and anchorages 
The fourteen ropes are grouped into two cables of seven ropes each, and each rope consists of six strands, each having seven wires. They are anchored vertically in pits at either end of the bridge and have facility for length adjustment. Each rope has its own anchorage yoke around which it passes and is then fastened back to itself using six U-bolt clips. The fourteen yokes are connected by links and bolts to three anchorage girders using a pattern of 4-6-4, and these girders bear against the top of the anchorage pits.

From the anchorage, the ropes run upwards, over a shoulder casting which bears on the thrust block, leave the sandstone pilaster, run directly to the tower where they turn again on turning saddles which have roller bearings, and cross the span with a low point approximately one metre above deck level. In plan the cables angle inwards from the anchorage pits till they leave the towers, and then form a curve back to the tower on the far side of the bridge. This curve is created by the plane of the suspension hangers. The maintenance files on the bridge, describe that in 1970 the cables were coated with Davidsons X3016 Anticorrosive primer, BA77 Lumatint and Line 176 Black Finish.

Suspension hangers and cross girders

From the cables, suspension rods of varying length hang in an inclined plane at  centres to support the deck. Anchorage on the suspension cables is by way of suspension clips which have a U-bolt to support the eye at the top end of the hanger rods. They terminate through crossbeams which were originally timber, but are now boxes of galvanised steel formed by welding channel sections together. The hangers terminate with wedge-shaped washers, nuts and lock-nuts to allow adjustment of vertical profile.

Deck Sitting on the cross beams, the current deck consists of longitudinal timber stringers supporting transverse decking of timbers topped by longitudinal timber sheeting, with a bituminous seal. The stringers are of varying depth to provide a camber to the deck.

As part of that work and to compensate for the loss of lateral and torsional stiffness of the new deck, a steel undertruss was installed. This connected to the abutment at each end and, by so doing, changed the manner in which the bridge was designed to articulate. It has since had a history of connection failures. In its current configuration, plastic flaps are fixed approx 1m in from each kerb to provide pedestrian access to the bridge, leaving approximately  carriageway for traffic.

Deck trusses

A suspension bridge is inherently a very flexible structure, with its vertical geometry (referred to as a funicular polygon which approximates a catenary shape which applies when the load on a cable is completely uniform) varying to balance the loads at each node. Stiffening of a minor nature is provided by the deck, but this is insufficient to prevent large vertical movements for heavy vehicles. To control this effect, this bridge is provided with stiffening trusses along each side of the deck. Each truss is pinned at the abutment and at the centre of the span. The truss form is of the Pratt truss configuration with timber top and bottom chords and timber verticals, with steel rod crossed diagonals. This configuration allows the truss to transfer loads from where it is applied in both directions to the elastic supports provided at each node by the suspension cables.

The top and bottom chords consist of pairs of horizontal timber whilst the verticals are single timbers. Splices in the chords have been affected with steel side plates, some of which may be original and some replaced. The original mild steel diagonal rods have been replaced with high strength steel rods (presumably grade 8.8 steel with an ultimate tensile strength of 800 MPa). These bear on galvanised steel thrust plates which are either original or similar to the original detail. To assist with durability, the chords and vertical tops have been capped with galvanised steel flashing.

Bearings and Centre Hinge The bottom chords of the side trusses terminate at mid-span at a pin joining the two truss halves, and at the abutments in bearings. The northern bearing and centre pin are of fixed pin type whilst the southern bearing is of a swing link style, detailed to allow longitudinal movement. This movement is a combination of thermal and geometric due to articulation of the suspension system. Materials used in the bearings and other ferric components include cast and wrought iron and also cast and wrought steel.

In addition, the bridge consists of a number of other features of a secondary nature. This includes lighting which illuminates the towers. These are in vandal resistant boxes mounted outside the approach parapets. Downpipes and drainage was installed to remove water ponding in 1974 works. Galvanised wire mesh grillesare provided to prevent bird access to the suspension cable saddle areas on each tower. Security grilles are provided to prevent entry to the anchor pit drainage tunnels. A mesh grille was added as a nut catcher at the end of each steel truss diagonal. A maintenance gantry is suspended from the underside of the bridge. The gantry is a lightweight steel truss structure supporting a personnel platform which can be skidded from the upstream to the downstreem side of the bridge. Utilitiy pipes include a water main on the eastern side at the roadway level and two PVC conduits on the western side of the bridge.

A number of plaques and historical markers are present either on the bridge or in its vicinity.

Condition  
As at 5 July 2018, the bridge and its various components are in a good condition due to regular maintenance and upkeep. The bridge is highly intact and retains a high degree of integrity.

Modifications  
Adapted from the Hampden Bridge Conservation Management Plan: 
 The bridge has undergone regular routine maintenance to preserve its operational use since its opening in 1898. 
 1938-42Major redecking works were undertaken. 
 1986Road accident on bridge caused damage to sandstone bridge structure resulting in partial demolition of eastern bridge approach. 
 2003RTA imposed a  load limit in August 2003.  or B-doubles would be prohibited. 
 2004The RTA was instructed to install a duplicate "Narrow Bridge" and "One Lane" warning sign on the Moss Vale side and to investigate road safety options on the approaches and monitor implementation of signage. 
 2005Signage approaching the bridge "no passing or overtaking". 
 2008/2009Some timber decking was replaced as required to keep the bridge safe. 
 2011Major works undertaken (To be confirmed)

Heritage listing  
As at 10 July 2018, Hampden Bridge is of state significance as the second major suspension bridge in NSW, and as the only surviving timber decked vehicular suspension bridge constructed in the nineteenth century (1898). The bridge is associated with engineer Ernest Macartney de Burgh, and builders Loveridge and Hudson. Hampden bridge has the capacity to represent some of the key characteristics of a small class of Australian suspension bridges, both vehicular and footbridges; many of which do not survive, or do not survive in their original form. The Hampden Bridge also has historic significance because it facilitated the agricultural prominence of the Kangaroo Valley area in the first decades of the twentieth century. The form of the bridge, its sophisticated structural design and elaborate tower castellations, reflects the cultural importance of this crossing at its time of construction, on what was then both a major route to the south of the state, and an area of emerging prosperity. The bridge now facilitates the growing importance of the area as a tourist destination. It is readily viewed and interpreted from the surrounding recreational areas and is held in high esteem by the local and wider community for its historic, aesthetic and technical qualities.

Hampden Bridge was listed on the New South Wales State Heritage Register on 2 August 2019 having satisfied the following criteria.

The place is important in demonstrating the course, or pattern, of cultural or natural history in New South Wales.

In service for over 110 years, on a route of major importance for the dairy industry of Kangaroo Valley and a route for communication and transport between both Sydney and inland centres and the south coast, Hampden Bridge facilitated the agricultural prominence of the Kangaroo Valley area in the first decades of the twentieth century.

The application of a relatively sophisticated but uncommon structural design, in combination with elaborate (and structurally unnecessary) tower castellations and other embellishments, reflect the cultural importance afforded this crossing on what was then both a major route to the south of the state, and an area of emerging prosperity. The bridge now facilitates the growing importance of the area as a tourist destination.

As a meeting and gathering place for the local Aboriginal people, the land occupied by Hampden Bridge is of historic significance. Kangaroo Valley was a place frequented as a meeting and gathering and the Dharawal (Tarawal or Thuruwal) travelled through the valley. The rock art sites nearby and camping areas are evidences of active Aboriginal occupation in this region. Hampden Bridge meets this criterion at a state level.

The place has a strong or special association with a person, or group of persons, of importance of cultural or natural history of New South Wales's history.

Hampden Bridge, as a major work of design and construction and a rare application of the suspension bridge principles in NSW, is strongly associated with in particular, E.M. De Burgh, eminent design engineer in NSW, who designed the bridge and has today a bridge named after him over the Lane Cove River, near Macquarie Park in Sydney. He was also responsible for the design of the Maldon suspension bridge, completed in 1903. In 1913 he was appointed chief engineer for water supply and sewerage, and was responsible for the design and construction of the Cordeaux, Avon and Nepean dams (Sydney water supply), the Chichester scheme for Newcastle and the Umberumberka scheme for Broken Hill. In 1921–25 he was a member of the Federal Capital Advisory Committee and prepared the original plans for Canberra's water supply.

The bridge construction is also associated with the prominent late nineteenth century stonework and construction specialists, Loveridge and Hudson, with their company name having carried into the twentieth century. Loveridge and Hudson founded in 1882 are also notable for their quarrying and application of the rarely deposited rock, trachyte (also known as Bowral tracyhte) which was used in Hampden Bridge as well in the construction of a number of historic buildings in Sydney (for example Queen Victoria Building and Equitable Life Assurance), Canberra (for example National Library and Treasury buildings) and the Southern Highlands (for example Bowral Courthouse). Hampden Bridge meets this criterion at a state level.

The place is important in demonstrating aesthetic characteristics and/or a high degree of creative or technical achievement in New South Wales.
 
The bridge is a highly attractive and distinctive structure. It has outstanding landmark qualities, spanning a serpentine ravine and announcing its presence with magnificent castellated sandstone towers which are joined by an elliptically arched cross beam under which traffic passes. The structure forms a gateway to the Kangaroo Valley township and to the South Coast beyond along the road from Moss Vale. The construction of the bridge at the end of the nineteenth century was a major and technically challenging undertaking incorporating sophisticated structural engineering for its time.

The early suspension bridge form is well suited to the site, with its deep, sheer sided ravine, and the necessity for a single long span was exemplified by loss of the previous two spanned, timber truss bridge to a major flood. Notwithstanding, the loss of some original fabric over time necessitated by maintenance and structural reasons, the defining components of the bridge (towers and suspension system) are readily visible and interpretable from deck level and from public spaces provided to each side of the bridge, its context and setting and in the gully below. The movement of the deck and cables as heavy traffic passes across the bridge is a distinctive experience for drivers, pedestrians and observers. The early suspension form clearly demonstrates the available technology and scope of construction at the time of its construction. It is a demonstration of the inventiveness of the early engineers in finding design solutions to develop infrastructure in daunting terrain. As such it ranks with other engineering feats such as the Zig Zag Railway at Lithgow. Hampden Bridge meets this criterion at a state level.

The place possesses uncommon, rare or endangered aspects of the cultural or natural history of New South Wales.

Hampden Bridge has rarity value at a State level as the only surviving timber decked vehicular suspension bridge from the nineteenth century. The bridge is a rare example of a historic type of road bridge of which few were ever constructed in NSW. It was the second major suspension bridge in NSW. As the sole surviving suspension bridge in NSW, it provides rare evidence of this bridge type and construction especially since the earlier Long Gully, Northbridge suspension bridge was replaced with a concrete arch bridge in 1929.It retains rare qualities of early suspension bridge design and technology which were not commonly applied elsewhere in the state or in other engineering structures.

It provides clear demonstration of a point in bridge design evolution which was rarely utilised in NSW in the late nineteenth century despite the availability of the technology. It also has a rare and hence unusual group of anchor structures which have a high degree of aesthetic detail when most of the construction effort for them should have been focussed on their strength and function. Hampden Bridge is of significance for its rarity value at the state level.

See also  

 List of bridges in Australia
 Historic bridges of New South Wales
 Hampden Bridge (Wagga Wagga)

References

Bibliography

Attribution

External links

 

1898 establishments in Australia
Road bridges in New South Wales
Bridges completed in 1898
Suspension bridges in Australia
Tourist attractions in New South Wales
Southern Tablelands
Sandstone bridges in Australia